"One Moment of Humanity" is the third episode of the second series of Space: 1999 (and the twenty-seventh overall episode of the programme).  The screenplay was written by Tony Barwick; the director was Charles Crichton.  The original title was "One Second of Humanity".  The final shooting script is dated 12 February 1976.  Live-action filming took place Thursday 4 March 1976 through Wednesday 17 March 1976.

Story 
It is 515 days after leaving Earth orbit, and Helena Russell and Maya are preparing for a formal party to be held the next evening.  Each models the gowns they have selected to wear. Helena suggests to Maya a different hairstyle might be more appealing to would-be suitor Tony Verdeschi; the Psychon woman uses her power of molecular transformation to instantly produce a new coiffure.  Their fun is interrupted by the red-alert klaxon.  By the time the senior staff has gathered in Command Centre, what started as a minor malfunction in the main electronics has grown into a cascading systems failure.  Alpha experiences complete life-support malfunction, then a total power loss.

A strange atmosphere pervades Command Centre.  The staff is overcome first by a wave of lightheadedness, then rendered completely immobile.  The eerie stillness is broken by a flare of energy, from which materialises a striking humanoid female.  She wanders among the involuntary tableau vivant, singling out Helena and Verdeschi.  They, like the rest, were affected by vertigo when falling under the alien power—and were supporting each other when frozen in place.  Presuming them to be lovers locked in an amorous embrace, she is satisfied with her discovery.

John Koenig revives first and confronts the intruder.  She assures him his people are fine and, with a nod, releases them from their paralysis.  After identifying herself as Zamara of the planet Vega, she declares the Moon has intruded upon her people's sphere of influence.  Koenig explains the incursion is by accident and without hostile intent.  She tells them Moonbase Alpha is being held in an electro force-field, which is not only suppressing their power but can immobilise their voluntary nervous systems.  Permitting them forty-eight hours of minimal life-support, Zamara haughtily announces two Alphans are required to return with her to Vega for an undisclosed purpose.

Koenig protests and is immobilised by the Vegan woman.  She selects the 'lovers' Verdeschi and Helena to accompany her.  They will travel via positronic transfer; all they have to do is wish it.  After some initial hesitation, they concentrate—and instantly find themselves standing in a spacious indoor garden on Vega.  Verdeschi looks out a frost-rimed window at a desolate snowscape.  Caressing his torso, Zamara informs him the temperature outside is always sub-zero and the atmosphere almost too thin to support life.  Within the city, they will find all they desire.

As Helena wanders amid the foliage, she is startled by a being with an immobile plastic face wearing a hooded grey coverall with the numeral '8' on the chest.  She then becomes aware of a well-built, arrogant male devouring her with his eyes.  The man, Zarl, informs her that the grey-clad being is a 'Number'—a simple automaton.  The Alphans are joined by other Vegans, all of them perfect physical specimens; the men bare-chested and virile, the women shapely and lithe.  More Numbers are called to bring food for the guests.  Attended to by Number Eight, Helena receives a whispered warning not to react as expected.  If she or her companion show aggression, the Vegans will kill them.

The food is deliberately vile and served with vicious jibes and intentional insults.  Helena manages to communicate with Verdeschi through meaningful looks and idiomatic word-play not to lose his temper.  On Moonbase, the environmental situation is grave.  Koenig orders a search of the entire installation for a device that could be generating the force-field.  Maya works to devise an alternative heat source that will not consume their dwindling oxygen.  An attempt to procure power-packs from the Eagles fails; with the travel-tube network non-operational, the launch pads are inaccessible.

On Vega, Verdeschi and Helena are escorted to a stark cell and locked in.  Finally alone, Helena relates the warning given her by Number Eight.  Wanting to find and question that robot, Verdeschi blasts the door open with his stun-gun.  He wonders why he was allowed to keep his weapon; she assumes the Vegans want them to use it in an act of violence.  They follow a Number through the city's corridors and into a cavern that serves as the robots' home.  When Helena asks them for help, Number Eight steps forward and removes his plastic mask—to uncover a humanoid face.  He reveals the Numbers are human and the Vegans are robots.

Eight tells them the tale of his ancestors.  When his people were overwhelmed by a sudden and severe climatic change, they built service robots and linked them with a complex computer.  The computers designed ever more advanced robots, which built even more sophisticated computers.  In the end, the physically perfect androids achieved sentience, learning human characteristics through observation—then enslaved the human population.  They want to eliminate their creators, but they have never been exposed to anger or hatred, and thus cannot kill.  The masks prevent the Vegans from seeing strong emotion should the humans let down their guard.

Eight warns the Alphans to be wary:  the androids will try to entice a demonstration of violence...then kill every last one of them.  While investigating the computer chamber, Verdeschi and Helena discover it is protected by a powerful energy barrier impervious to laser fire.  Zarl and Zamara appear, reproaching them for leaving their 'quarters'.  The Alphans' excuse is they are worried about their friends on the Moon and are trying to return there.  The androids tell them to simply desire it.  They do, and find themselves back on an Alpha that is powered up and running—and apparently deserted.

A quick search proves they are the only two people present.  Worse, calculations show the Moon is now two light-years distant from its previous position in the Vega system; they must have travelled through a time warp during the positronic transfer and arrived weeks in the future.  They can only speculate the rest of the Alpha population was taken down to the planet.  When they try to wish their return to Vega, nothing happens—the process has apparently been turned off.

They are, in fact, in a replica of Alpha.  By isolating them, the Vegans intend to foster suspicion, paranoia and murderous rage between them.  (Zarl finds the procedure cruel, but is convinced of its necessity by Zamara.)  Using circumstantial evidence, they manoeuvre Helena into believing the security chief gave her a drugged coffee.  Verdeschi is then made to assume the doctor sabotaged the life-support system.  This exercise in psychological warfare ends with the two friends hunting each other with lasers set to kill.  Thinking the other is unbalanced, each tries to humour the other.  Finally, realising that neither is responsible for the deeds the other accuses them of, they recognise the situation for what it is.  As the two gloat over their victory, the androids come out of hiding and Zamara admits failure—this time.

On Alpha, the temperature is below freezing and the air stale and dank.  Koenig receives a report of an intruder in the Recreation Section:  Zamara.  Her last experiment a failure, she is reviewing the entire micro-disc library for a literary example of humans driven to commit murder.  After a stun-gun blast has no effect on the android, she informs them all the Vegans are part of a complete and indestructible chain.  Her search ends with Shakespeare's Othello, discovering the emotion of jealousy can compel humans to kill.  Koenig informs her that the scheme will not work with Helena and Verdeschi as they are not lovers—he is Helena's lover, and (to get her down to the planet) identifies Maya to be Verdeschi's.

Zamara travels to Vega with Koenig and Maya.  She plans to manipulate the Othello scenario to its full potential.  Zarl/Iago will seduce Helena/Desdemona, and the all-consuming jealousy of her lover Koenig/Othello will inflame him to commit murder.  Watching the tender reunion between Koenig and Helena, Zarl is uncertain and questions if they could be missing something by rejecting the emotion of love.

The four Alphans pool their information and come up with a plan of action.  Maya transforms into a native bird to escape the garden unnoticed.  She can hopefully circumvent the energy barrier and inspect the master computer for any exploitable weakness.  With Verdeschi's help, Koenig will contain his anger until she shuts down the system.  The seduction begins, with the masculine android sweeping Helena away into an erotic dance.  Zarl's advances are blatant, but Helena's response is impassive; she is concerned that any resistance could be translated into an act of aggression.

The music's tempo increases, and Zarl's moves become more wild and provocative.  Helena is able to deflect his caressing hands with her own non-aggressive motions coordinated with the dance.  Koenig fumes silently under the scrutiny of the Vegans as Zarl's gentle rape progresses.  A passive Helena is lowered onto a pile of cushions by Zarl.  Emotions stirring, the Vegan plants a passionate kiss on her mouth.  In spite of herself, she is aroused.  Maya returns with grave news:  the computer has a fail-safe mechanism—interference with its power source initiates an explosion that could destroy the entire planet.  Koenig leaps into action as he sees Helena surrendering herself to Zarl's foreplay.  He pulls the android man off her and slugs him.

The Vegans are elated; they have finally witnessed an act of violence and rage.  Goaded on by Zamara, Zarl practices death-blows with his powerful android fists, smashing furniture and statuary.  As he turns his attention to Koenig, the other Alphans quickly confer.  The Vegans' weakness is their interlinked consciousness—like a string of Christmas-tree lights...if one fails, they all fail.  Helena stands between Koenig and Zarl.  She pleads for the android to take the final step in his evolution and become human.  She has witnessed his flashes of tenderness and compassion; now complete the journey and experience love.

Ignoring Zamara's shrill protests, Zarl takes Helena's outstretched hand and presses it to his lips.  The intensity of emotion is too much for him; rapture gives way to agonising torment and he crumples to the floor.  With a wail of defeat, Zamara and the other androids wind down, immobilised.  Having watched from the shrubbery, the Numbers gather and peel off their masks, rejoicing in their new-found freedom.  Zarl manages to briefly cling to existence; he declares he did feel love at the end.  Comforted by a teary-eyed Helena, he tells her it is worth oblivion to have experienced just that one moment of humanity, then expires.

Cast

Starring
 Martin Landau — Commander John Koenig
 Barbara Bain — Doctor Helena Russell

Also Starring
 Catherine Schell — Maya

Featuring
 Tony Anholt — Tony Verdeschi
 Nick Tate — Captain Alan Carter
 Zienia Merton — Sandra Benes

Guest Stars
 Billie Whitelaw — Zamara
 Leigh Lawson — Zarl

Also Featuring
 Geoffrey Bayldon — Number Eight

Uncredited Artists
 Robert Reeves — Peter
 Sarah Bullen — Kate

Music 

An original score was composed for this episode by Derek Wadsworth.  The second movement of Beethoven's 'Symphony No. 9 in D minor' was played by Zamara in the Alpha Recreation Centre.  'Storm at Sun-Up' by Canadian jazz composer Gino Vannelli, was selected by choreographer Lionel Blair to accompany the seduction dance during filming, and served as Wadsworth's inspiration when preparing his score.  A brief moment of the 'space horror music' composed by Vic Elms and Alan Willis for "Ring Around the Moon" can be heard when Zarl takes Helena's hand and says, 'The play begins.'  This is the only occurrence of a first-series music-track being used this year.

Production Notes 

 The shooting script, written by former UFO script editor Tony Barwick, contains an epilogue cut for time from the final edit.  The viewer would have seen a restored Alpha dispatching a recovery Eagle, and Alan Carter arriving on Vega with cold-weather gear for Koenig and company.  With the Vegan city powered down, the Alphans discuss the future with the Numbers, who are looking forward to re-learning the basics of survival in their world's harsh environment.  Helena and Koenig then exchange banter regarding Zarl; though the android was a good-looking and masculine Iago, Helena states she much prefers her Othello.  The script's status-report date is stated as 415 days by Helena and was changed in post-production.
 After completing this episode, series regular Zienia Merton decided to leave the programme.  She was dissatisfied with her lack of a contract and diminished involvement in the second series.  Feeling the new American producer Fred Freiberger did not appreciate her contribution to the previous series and not seeing any potential change in the foreseeable future, she opted to depart. Merton would change her mind and return to the show three months later, but during her absence, her character would be replaced by Japanese operative Yasko.  Yasko was portrayed by Yasuko Nagazumi, the wife of Space: 1999 director Ray Austin.
 Coming off her critically acclaimed, award-winning performance as Mrs. Baylock in the 1976 horror film The Omen, Billie Whitelaw was cast as the sensuously diabolical android Zamara.  A veteran of British theatre, her stage-trained voice had to be modulated in post-production to prevent it from overwhelming all other elements of the soundtrack.
 Costume designer Emma Porteous recalls how she and production designer Keith Wilson closely collaborated to produce a cohesive look for the beautiful and sensual world of Vega.  The sets for this production were revamped from the Grove of Psyche, the corridors of Psychon and the caverns left over from "The Metamorph".  The red nylon quilted jackets introduced in "Dragon's Domain" were worn here by Catherine Schell and background extra Robert Reeves.
 A large quantity of publicity stills for the second series were taken during the filming of this episode.  The regular cast, alone or in combinations, were photographed in a variety of action poses involving attacking aliens.  Among these aliens were stuntmen dressed in the Vegan android costume and 'Number' costume, a Highlander from "Journey to Where" and stuntman Frank Maher in his Decontamination Unit coverall from "The Exiles", his face smeared with grey greasepaint.
 Apart from simple laser-beam overlays, teleportation energy-flares and one big-screen shot with a burn-in of the star-chart showing the before-and-after positions of the Moon, there are no substantial visual effects in this episode.  Verdeschi's POV shot of the surface of Vega and the single shot of the planet over Moonbase Alpha were library footage both taken from the first-series episode "Death's Other Dominion".

Novelisation 

The episode was adapted in the second Year Two Space: 1999 novel Mind-Breaks of Space by Michael Butterworth and J. Jeff Jones published in 1977.  It included the deleted epilogue scene.

References

External links 
Space: 1999 - "One Moment of Humanity" - The Catacombs episode guide
Space: 1999 - "One Moment of Humanity" - Moonbase Alpha's Space: 1999 page

1976 British television episodes
Space: 1999 episodes
Fiction set around Vega